Tropiduchidae is a family of planthoppers in the order Hemiptera. There are at least 160 genera and 600 described species in Tropiduchidae.

See also
 List of Tropiduchidae genera

References

Further reading

 
 

 
Auchenorrhyncha families
Fulgoromorpha